"Kataomoi" (One-Sided Love) is Jun Shibata's 4th single and first to break into the Top 20. It was released on October 23, 2002 and peaked at #20.

Track listing
Kataomoi (片想い; One-Sided Love)
Utsukushii hito (美しい人; Beautiful Person)

Charts

External links
https://web.archive.org/web/20161030094458/http://www.shibatajun.com/— Shibata Jun Official Website

2002 singles
Jun Shibata songs
2002 songs